The Tianchan Peking Opera Center and Yifu Theater, commonly known as Tianchan Yifu Theater, or just Tianchan, Yifu, or Tianchan Theater, is a theater in Shanghai, China. Built in 1925, it opened on the Chinese New Year of 1926 as the Tahsin Theater(), and was subsequently taken over by the tycoon  Ku Chu-hsuan in 1930, who renamed as "Tianchan."

Most performances there are Peking Operas, with occasional Yue opera (also known as "Shaohsing opera") or Kunqu performances.

References

External links

Theatres in Shanghai
Peking opera
Chinese opera theatres
1926 establishments in China